Daniel Schulman is an American author and journalist. He is a senior editor at the Washington, D.C. bureau of Mother Jones. In 2014, he wrote the book Sons of Wichita, a biography of the Koch family. In 2015, Schulman, along with David Corn, released a story in Mother Jones questioning whether Bill O'Reilly's story about his coverage of the Falklands War was accurate.

References

External links

Living people
Mother Jones (magazine) people
American political journalists
Year of birth missing (living people)